The Copa del Generalísimo 1973 Final was the 71st final of what would be called the Copa del Rey ("The King's Cup") after the death of Generalissimo Francisco Franco. The final was played at Vicente Calderón Stadium in Madrid, on 29 June 1973, being won by Athletic Bilbao, who beat Castellón 2-0.

Details

References

1973
Copa
Athletic Bilbao matches
June 1973 sports events in Europe